George Colquhoun Hamilton Dunlop (28 July 1846 – 7 June 1929) was a Scottish cricketer active in 1868 who played for Lancashire. He was born in Edinburgh and died in Dumfries. He appeared in one first-class match as a righthanded batsman, scoring 17 runs.

Notes

1846 births
1929 deaths
Scottish cricketers
Lancashire cricketers